Kirchenlamitz is a town in the district of Wunsiedel, in Bavaria, Germany. It is situated in the Fichtelgebirge, 13 km northwest of Wunsiedel and 19 km south of Hof.

References

 
Wunsiedel (district)